The 1967 Cardiff City Council election was held on Thursday 11 May 1967 to elect councillors to Cardiff City Council in Cardiff, Glamorgan, Wales. It took place on the same day as several other county borough elections in Wales and England.

The previous elections to this one were in May 1966 and the next elections would be in May 1968.

The election saw the Conservatives taking a significant number of seats back from the Labour Party, as well as winning every new seat.

Background
Cardiff County Borough Council had been created in 1889. Cardiff became a city in 1905. Elections to the local authority were held annually, though not all council seats were included in each contest, because each of the three councillors in each ward stood down for election in rotation.

The council also comprised aldermen who were elected for a six-year period by the councillors.

The local government elections took place in the context of Harold Wilson's Labour UK government struggling with cabinet splits over their plans to join the European Common Market.

New wards
Two new Cardiff electoral wards of Rhiwbina and Whitchurch were created for this election, following the transfer of these areas from Cardiff Rural.

Three councillors were elected for each of these wards at this election, increasing the numbers on Cardiff City Council by six. Because each of the three councillors in every ward stood down for re-election in rotation, the winners of the Rhiwbina/Whitchurch polls would sit for three years before standing down, the second placed candidates would sit for two years and the third-placed candidates would need to stand for re-election in 12 months time.

Overview of the result

Twenty-three seats in 19 electoral wards were up for election in May 1967. In a "landslide election" the Conservative Party gained their biggest ever majority on the council, taking 4 seats off the Labour Party, one of the Liberals and winning all six new seats in Rhiwbina and Whitchurch. Gains included the traditionally Labour seat in the South ward, taken by 36 votes. Labour group leader, Alderman Lyons, blamed Independent candidates splitting the Labour vote. The council gained its first ever black councillor, Manuel Delgado, in the Splott ward. It also gained a brother and sister combination, with Trevor Tyrell joining his sister, Bella Brown, in the Canton Ward.

Plaid Cymru were fielding a large number of candidates for the first time in Cardiff and polled well in Plasmawr and the two new Rhiwbina/Whitchurch wards.

Council composition
Immediately following the election the Conservatives had a majority of 18 on the council, though after aldermanic elections the balance on the city council was expected to be 50 Conservatives and 26 Labour representatives. 11 Conservative aldermen were elected on 22 May, with the two Labour aldermen standing for re-election losing their places. Conservative alderman Layton Lougher was also replaced.

Ward results
Contests took place in every ward at this election. In most wards one council seat was up for election, but in Rhiwbina and Whitchurch three seats were available.

Adamsdown

Canton

Cathays

Central

Ely

Gabalfa

Grangetown

Llandaff

Llanishen

Penylan

Plasmawr

Plasnewydd

Olwen Watkin had won the previous election for the Liberal Party.

Rhiwbina

Riverside

Roath

Rumney

South

Splott

Manuel Delgado became Cardiff's first ever black councillor.

Whitchurch

* = 'retiring' ward councillor for re-election
[a] = vote figure missing from results

References

Cardiff City Council
Council elections in Cardiff
1960s in Cardiff